James Arthur Moore is an American horror novelist and short story writer.

In 2003, he was nominated for a Bram Stoker Award for "Best Novel" for his book Serenity Falls.  In 2006, the novella Bloodstained Oz (co-authored by Christopher Golden) was nominated for a Bram Stoker Award for "Best Long Fiction".  He wrote the novelization of Buffy the Vampire Slayer's  Chaos Bleeds (based on the video game written by Christopher Golden).  Many of his books have been released by small press publishers like Earthling, Cemetery Dance as signed hardcover limited editions.

He also has done a lot of Collectible card game and Role-playing game related work  for White Wolf, Inc including writing manuals, storyteller's guides, short stories, modules, and novels.

Selected bibliography

Novels and novellas
Subject Seven (Razorbill, 2011)
Vendetta (Morning Star Press, 2009)
Deeper (Hardcover: Necessary Evil Press, 2008; Paperback: Berkley, 2009) 
"Dear Diary" - a short story available as a PDF download from Necessary Evil Press that involves a character from the novel Deeper
Little Boy Blue - a limited edition chapbook (2008, Bloodletting Press)
The Haunted Forest Tour - Co-authored by Jeff Strand (Earthling Publications, late 2007)
Blood Red (Earthling Publications, 2005 and Berkley Books, 2007) 
"Blood Tide" (Earthling Publications, 2005) - A limited edition (250 copies) short story that was given away for free at the World Horror Convention in 2005. It also serves as a prologue to Blood Red.
Newbies (Smooch, 2004) 
Buffy the Vampire Slayer: Chaos Bleeds (Simon Spotlight Entertainment, 2003) 
Fireworks (Meisha Merlin Publishing, 2001 and Leisure Books, 2003) 
Under the Overtree (Meisha Merlin Publishing, 2000 and Leisure Books, 2002)

Bloodstained series
Bloodstained Oz - Co-authored by Christopher Golden (Earthling Publications, 2006) 
Bloodstained Wonderland - contracted and slated (not yet published)
Bloodstained Neverland - contracted and slated (not yet published)

Chris Corin series
Possessions (Leisure Books, 2004) 
Rabid Growth (Leisure Books, 2005)

Harvest series
"Harvest Moon/Harvest Gods" - short story published in Slices
"Bone Harvest" - Chapbook limited to 500 copies published by Cemetery Dance Publications, 2008
"Patchwork" - 300 copy Limited edition novelette (Bloodletting Press, 2008)
Harvest Moon (Cemetery Dance Publications, 2006) 
"Shades of Gray" - short story published in Slices (involves a character from the novel Harvest Moon)

Serenity Falls "trilogy"
This series was originally released as one book published by Meisha Merlin Publishing in 2003.  Jove publishing got the rights to it and reprinted them in an expanded and extended form as three separate books in 2005.  There is more story in the new Jove printings.

Serenity Falls (Meisha Merlin Publishing, 2003) 
Writ in Blood (Jove, May 2005) 
The Pack (Jove, June 2005) 
Dark Carnival (Jove, July 2006)

Seven Forges series
Seven Forges (Angry Robot, Sept 2013)
The Blasted Lands Seven Forges, Book II (Angry Robot, June 2014)
City of Wonders, Book III (Angry Robot, November 2015)
The Silent Army, Seven Forges book IV (Angry Robot, May 2016)

Tides of War series 

 The Last Sacrifice (Jan 2017)
 Fallen Gods (July 2018)
 Gates of the Dead (Jan 2019)

Short stories, anthologies, and collections
Slices - a short story collection (Earthling Publications, 2009). Contains the following:
"Greasepainted Smile"
"Shades of Gray" (Original to this collection)
"War Stories"
"Skinwalker"
"Simon's Muse"
"A Place where there is Peace"
"In the Oubliette" (original to this collection)
"Hathburn Avenue"
"My Brother's Keeper" (original to this collection)
"The Dark Place"
"Harvest Gods"
Story Notes

Short Trips: Destination Prague - A Doctor Who anthology featuring the short story "Room for Improvement" (Big Finish Productions, 2007) 
Halloween: New Poems - a poetry anthology edited by Al Sarrantonio that contains the poems "They Grow Pumpkins Down There," "Jack's Lantern," and "Autumn" (Cemetery Dance Publications, 2009) 
The Big Book of NECON", a collection editied by Bob Booth that features the piece "Virtually Perfect" (Cemetery Dance Publications, 2009) British Invasion - anthology co-edited by James A. Moore, Christopher Golden, and Tim Lebbon featuring Kealan Patrick Burke, Ramsey Campbell and many others (Cemetery Dance Publications, 2009) Monstrous: 20 Tales of Giant Creature Terror - an anthology edited by Ryan C. Thomas that contains the story "Whatever Became of Randy" (Permuted Press, 2009) 

Digital chapbooksDiscarded Blessings - a digital-only chapbook collection (Darkside Digital, 2009). Contains the following short stories:
"Discards"
"Mary's Blessing"
"The Walker Place" - digital only chapbook (Cemetery Dance Publications, 2009)
"Home for the Holidays" - digital only chapbook (Cemetery Dance Publications, 2008)

Gaming related works
Most, if not all, of these are set in White Wolf's World of Darkness

Vampire: The Eternal StruggleHouse of Secrets (a novel co-authored by Kevin Andrew Murphy) 

Vampire: The MasqueradeBerlin By Night, a supplement for Vampire: The MasqueradeVampire Players Guide Second Edition, includes
"Creative Combat," (an essay)
"The Samedi"World of Darkness 2Storyteller's GuideDemon Hunter XVampire Deluxe Edition"Necromancy" section of the Thaumaturgy book.

Werewolf: The ApocalypseWerewolf: Hell-Storm (novel) When Will You Rage? (short story included)Book of the Wyrm, sections including:EnticersThunderwyrms"The First Ronin"
"Phantasmi, Bitter Rages"
"Oases"
"Dangerous Toys"Book of the Wyrm, Second EditionThe Valkenburg Foundation includes his story "Skins," (reprinted in Werewolf Chronicles Volume 1).The Werewolf Players Guide, sections including:
"Why the Garou Run in Packs" (short story)
"The Get of Fenris"
"The Wendigo"
"The Nuwisha (Werecoyote)"
"Ananasi (Werespider)" (with Brett Brooks)
"Do You Need a Pack?" (essay)The Werewolf Players Guide, Second EditionStoryteller's Handbook"In Dreams and Nightmares," for the Rage Across The Amazon supplement
"The Black Forest Sept" for the Caerns: Places of Power supplement (reprinted in Werewolf Chronicles Volume 2).Three Short adventures for the Werewolf Storytellers' ScreenOutcastsThe Get Of Fenris TribebookFreak Legion: A Player's Guide to FomoriNuwishaWerewolf: The Wild WestWerewolf: The Wild West CompanionWerewolf: The Wild West Tales from the Trails, MexicoMage: The Ascension
"Harvest Time" (an adventure for the Chantries supplement)The Book of Shadows: The Mage Players Hand Book, sections including:
"The Euthanatos"
"The Hollow Ones"
"Orphans"
"The Nephandi"The Chaos Factor (sourcebook and adventure for Mage)Book of MadnessBook of WorldsWraith: The OblivionNecropolis: AtlantaHaunts (about Hermitage Castle)Dark Kingdom of Jade Adventures: "Hiroshima""Mediums" (short story)Wraith: The Oblivion, Second EditionWraith Players GuideShadow Players GuideLegionsThe Great WarChangeling: The DreamingChangeling Players GuideDreams and NightmaresLand of Eight Million DreamsWhite Wolf Magazine
Issue #40 contains the short story "A Psychological Profile on Samuel Haight."
Issues #42- #44 included a three part Werewolf: The Apocalypse adventure.

Comic books
 Clive Barker's Hellraiser'' issue #15 featured "Of Love, Cats and Curiosity" (James A. Moore's debut publication)

References and links

James A. Moore's official webpage
List of books that have been published and are about to be published by Earthling Publishing including James A. Moore's books
James Moore's Harvest Moon at Cemetery Dance Publishing (includes limited edition information)

Bram Stoker Award nominees 2006, also as a PDF.
REVIEW : Seven Forges

1965 births
20th-century American male writers
20th-century American novelists
20th-century American short story writers
21st-century American male writers
21st-century American novelists
21st-century American short story writers
American horror writers
American male novelists
American male short story writers
Chapbook writers
Living people
Role-playing game designers
Role-playing game writers